Larry Ford (born April 15, 1988) is an American football defensive lineman who is currently a free agent. He was signed by the Florida Tarpons as an undrafted free agent in 2012. He played college football at West Virginia University, after transferring in from Coffeyville Community College. After the Tarpons, Ford was signed by the PIFL's Lehigh Valley Steelhawks, where he played during the 2013 season, before signing with the Orlando Predators of the Arena Football League (AFL). Ford returned to Lehigh Valley in 2014, and eventually signed with the Cleveland Gladiators during the season. On March 3, 2017, Ford signed with the High Country Grizzlies. He signed with the Atlanta Havoc for the 2018 season.

On July 8, 2021, Ford signed with the Carolina Cobras of the National Arena League (NAL). On December 9, 2021, Ford re-signed with the Carolina Cobras of the National Arena League (NAL).

References

External links
West Virginia bio
Arena Football League bio

1988 births
Living people
American football defensive ends
Coffeyville Red Ravens football players
West Virginia Mountaineers football players
Florida Tarpons players
San Antonio Talons players
Lehigh Valley Steelhawks players
Orlando Predators players
Pittsburgh Power players
Cleveland Gladiators players
High Country Grizzlies players
American Arena League players